Valvata sincera, common name the mossy valvata is a species of small freshwater snail with a gill and an operculum, an aquatic gastropod mollusk in the family Valvatidae, the valve snails.

References

 Turgeon, D.D., et al. 1998. Common and scientific names of aquatic invertebrates of the United States and Canada. American Fisheries Society Special Publication 26

Further reading 
Boreal Turret Snail, Valvata sincera. Natural Heritage & Endangered Species Program. 2 pp.

Valvatidae
Gastropods described in 1824